Stig Axel Johannes Rindborg (30 September 1929 – 17 July 2018) was a Swedish politician, member of the Moderate Party, and lawyer. Rindborg was a Member of parliament in 1985, and 1991–2002. He has also held the title of Financial County Councillor on Stockholm County Council during the 1980s. As a member of parliament he served on the taxation, law and finance committees.

Aside from politics, Stig Rindborg drove a law firm, was chairman of the lobby organisation Företagarna and was a board member in several companies.

Political career 
1978 – 1981 – Management-committee chairman in Stockholm County Council
1985 – Member of Riksdag (Parliament)
1986 – 1988 – Financial County Councillor in the Stockholm County Council
1991 – 2002 – Member of Riksdag (Parliament)

References 

20th-century Swedish lawyers
Members of the Riksdag from the Moderate Party
1929 births
2018 deaths